Janis Irwin (born September 9, 1984) is a Canadian politician who was elected to the Legislative Assembly of Alberta in the 2019 Alberta general election. She represents the electoral district of Edmonton-Highlands-Norwood as a member of the Alberta New Democratic Party. She serves as the Official Opposition Critic for Status of Women and LGBTQ2S+ Issues, and is the Official Opposition Deputy Whip.

A teacher prior to her election, Irwin is queer, and is the only openly LGBTQ MLA in the Alberta legislature. She previously ran as the federal New Democratic Party candidate for Edmonton Griesbach in the 2015 Canadian federal election.

Personal life 
Irwin grew up in Barrhead, Alberta. Prior to being elected, Irwin was a high school social studies teacher in Bawlf, Alberta and served as vice-principal in Forestburg, Alberta. Irwin came out in her late 20s. In 2010, Irwin moved back to Edmonton to start working with Alberta Education, focusing on curriculum.

Education
Irwin holds a Bachelor of Education from the University of Alberta, a Master of Education from the University of Calgary, and completed PhD-level coursework at the University of Alberta without defending her thesis.

Provincial politics 
Since being elected as a member of Legislative Assembly of Alberta, Irwin has been an advocate against conversion therapy by citing the harmful organization Journey Canada with its ties to this practice. Another issue Irwin has been strongly advocating on is the legal protections of gay-straight alliances (GSAs) in the education system in Alberta.

Irwin serves on the Standing Committee on Alberta's Economic Future, as well as the Standing Committee on Private Bills and Private Members' Public Bills.

Irwin was previously a member of the Standing Committee on the Alberta Heritage Savings Trust Fund and the Standing Committee on Families and Communities.

Irwin is the Official Opposition Deputy Whip and Critic for LGBTQ2S+ and Women's Issues.

In the Legislature, Irwin confessed humorously to having a "gay agenda", which she described as consisting of her drinking coffee, going to work, mowing her lawn, and cleaning her house just like heterosexual people do. Irwin has joked that she is the only openly "ML-gay" in the legislature, which does not mean she needs to speak on all gay-related issues.

Electoral history

2015 federal election

2019 general election

References

Alberta New Democratic Party MLAs
People from Barrhead, Alberta
Politicians from Edmonton
Lesbian politicians
Women MLAs in Alberta
21st-century Canadian politicians
Canadian LGBT people in provincial and territorial legislatures
New Democratic Party candidates for the Canadian House of Commons
1984 births
Living people
21st-century Canadian women politicians
Canadian lesbians
21st-century Canadian LGBT people